On the Run (Portuguese: Em Fuga) is a 1999 crime comedy film directed by Bruno de Almeida in his directorial debut. It stars Michael Imperioli and John Ventimiglia and is written by Joseph Minion, based on a story by de Almeida and Jonathan Berman. 

The film premiered in Portugal in January 1999 and was given a limited theatrical release in the United States on June 2, 2000. It won the award for Best Film at the 1999 Ourense Film Festival in Spain and was nominated the Open Palm Award at the Gotham Awards. It had its cable debut on The Independent Film Channel in 2001 and was released on DVD in 2002.

Premise
Albert is an introverted travel agent living a lonely life in New York City. When Louie, his best friend from childhood, appears having just escaped from prison, Albert's quiet existence is permanently disrupted. What ensues is one long, crazy night in New York that will change both their lives forever.

Cast

Reception
Lisa Nesselson of Variety wrote, "Mostly inventive, and consistently well played, this mismatched-buddy film boasts ample laughs and awkward situations that are easy to identify with, wacky though they are." Writing in the New York Press, Matt Zoller Seitz said "the vibe is wonderfully fresh, and there isn't a dull or unpleasurable scene in the movie, thanks to De Almeida's ability to build spare but sustained comic setpieces and give the actors room to maneuver within them." He also praised the acting of the two male leads as well as the supporting cast. Portuguese publication Público similarly lauded the pairing of Imperioli and Ventimiglia and said they are given a "rare opportunity to shine as protagonists."

Awards
1999 Ourense Independent Film Festival, Grand Prize for Best Feature - winner
2000 Gotham Film Awards, Open Palm Award - nominated

Home media
On the Run was released on DVD by Pathfinder Home Ent. on August 27, 2002.

References

External links
Official site

On the Run trailer at YouTube

1999 films
1999 directorial debut films
1999 independent films
1999 comedy films
1990s buddy comedy films
1990s crime comedy films
Films set in New York City
American buddy comedy films